Madauk is a town located in Nyaunglebin Township, Bago Region of Myanmar. Madauk is an ancient city that has been famous since the time of the ancient Mon kings.

Etymology
The town's name is of Mon origin. Pronounced Kamadauk, it literally translates to "brick reservoir" in Mon. Although Madauk and Shwegyin are separate towns, they are often referred to as Shwegyin Magadauk. Nyaunglebin and Madauk are connected by a  railway.

References 

Populated places in Bago Region